Charles Stack may refer to:

 Charles Stack (lawyer) (1935–2022), Florida lawyer and former federal judicial nominee to the U.S. Court of Appeals
 Charles Stack (bishop) (1825–1914), Anglican bishop